The Soviet Air Forces (VVS SSSR; literally “Military Air Forces of the Union of Soviet Socialist Republics”) were one of the air forces of the Soviet Union. The other was the Soviet Air Defence Forces. The Air Forces were formed from components of the Imperial Russian Air Service in 1917, and faced their greatest test during World War II. The groups were also involved in the Korean War, and dissolved along with the Soviet Union itself in 1991–92. Former Soviet Air Forces' assets were subsequently divided into several air forces of former Soviet republics, including the new Russian Air Force. "March of the Pilots" was its song.

Origins
The All-Russia Collegium for Direction of the Air Forces of the Old Army (translation is uncertain) was formed on 20 December 1917. This was a Bolshevik aerial headquarters initially led by Konstantin Akashev. Along with a general postwar military reorganisation, the collegium was reconstituted as the "Workers' and Peasants' Red Air Fleet" (Glavvozduhflot), established on 24 May 1918 and given the top-level departmental status of "Main Directorate".

It became the Directorate of the USSR Air Forces on 28 March 1924, and then the Directorate of the Workers-Peasants Red Army Air Forces on 1 January 1925.

After the creation of the Soviet state many efforts were made in order to modernize and expand aircraft production, led by its charismatic and energetic commander, General Yakov Alksnis, an eventual victim of Joseph Stalin's Great Purge. Domestic aircraft production increased significantly in the early 1930s and towards the end of the decade, the Soviet Air Force introduced Polikarpov I-15 and I-16 fighters and Tupolev SB and SB-bis and DB-3 bombers.

Spanish civil war

One of the first major tests for the VVS came in 1936 with the Spanish Civil War, in which the latest Soviet and German aircraft designs were employed against each other in fierce air-to-air combat. At first, the I-16 proved superior to any Luftwaffe fighters, and managed to achieve local air superiority wherever they were employed. However, the Soviets refused to supply the plane in adequate numbers, and their aerial victories were soon squandered because of their limited use. Later, Bf 109s delivered to Franco's Spanish Nationalist air forces secured air superiority for the Nationalists, one they would never relinquish.

On 19 November 1939, VVS headquarters was again titled the Main Directorate of the Red Army Air Forces under the WPRA HQ.

1930s aviation and propaganda

Positive heroism

The early 1930s saw a shift in ideological focus away from collectivist propaganda and towards "positive heroism."
Instead of glorifying socialist collectivism as a means of societal advancement, the Soviet Communist Party began uplifting individuals who committed heroic actions that advanced the cause of socialism. In the case of aviation, the government began glorifying people who utilized aviation technology as opposed to glorifying the technology itself. Pilots such as Valery Chkalov, Georgy Baydukov, Alexander Belyakov, and Mikhail Gromov—as well as many others—were raised to the status of heroes for their piloting skills and achievements.

Transpolar flights of 1937

In May 1937, Stalin charged pilots Chkalov, Baydukov, and Belyakov with the mission to navigate . On 20 June 1937, the aviators landed their ANT-25 in Vancouver, Washington. A month later, Stalin ordered the departure of a second crew to push the boundaries of modern aviation technology even further.

The public reaction to the transpolar flights was euphoric. The media called the pilots "Bolshevik knights of culture and progress." Soviet citizens celebrated Aviation Day on 18 August with as much zeal as they celebrated the October Revolution anniversary. Literature including poems, short stories, and novels emerged celebrating the feats of the aviator-celebrities. Feature films like Victory, Tales of Heroic Aviators, and Valery Chkalov reinforced the "positive hero" imagery, celebrating the aviators' individuality within the context of a socialist government.

Folkloric themes in aviation propaganda

Soviet propaganda, newspaper articles, and other forms of media sought to connect Soviet citizens to relevant themes from daily life. For aviation, Stalin's propagandists drew on Russian folklore. Examples increased dramatically following the successes of the transpolar flights by Chkalov and Gromov in 1937. Aviators were referred to symbolically as sokoly (falcons), orly (eagles), or bogatyr (warriors). Newspapers told traditional Russian narratives (skazki) of fliers conquering time and space (prostranstvo), overcoming barriers and completing their missions in triumph. Even the story of each aviator suggests roots in old Russian storytelling and narratives—virtuous heroes striving to reach an end goal, encountering and conquering any obstacles in their path. By using folklore rhetoric, Stalin and Soviet propagandists connected aviation achievements to Russian heritage, making aviation seem more accessible to the Soviet population. Furthermore, the narratives emphasize the aviators' selflessness and devotion to a higher socialist ideal, pointing to Soviet leaders as inspirers and role models.

Paternalism was also a theme that Soviet propagandists exploited in aviation culture. The media presented Stalin as an example and inspiration, a father figure and role model to the most prominent Soviet pilots of the period. When recounting stories of meetings between Stalin and Chkalov, for example, Soviet newspapers spoke of Stalin's paternalism towards the young pilot. The paternal metaphor was completed with the addition of a maternal figure—Russia, the motherland, who had produced "father" Stalin's heroic sons such as Chkalov.

The use of familial metaphors not only evoked traditional hereditary pride and historic Russian patriotism, they boosted Stalin's image as a benevolent leader. Most importantly, paternalism served to promote the message of individual subordination to authority. Through his paternal relationships with Soviet pilots, Stalin developed an "ethos of deference and obedience" for Soviet society to emulate.

Aviation and the purges

The successful achievements in Soviet aviation also came during the worst days of the Great Purge. The transpolar flights in summer 1937 occurred following the arrest and execution of a large body of the Red Army officer corps. Fifteen of sixteen total army commanders were executed; more than three-fourths of the VVS senior officers were arrested, executed, or relieved of duty. News coverage of the arrests was relatively little compared to treatment of aviation exploits, deflecting attention away from the arrests.

Early combat
Some practical combat experience had been gained in participating in the Spanish Civil War, and against Japan in the Far Eastern border conflicts. Shortly before the start of war with Germany a Soviet Volunteer Group was sent to China to train the pilots from the Republic of China Air Force for the continuing war with the Japanese. However, these experiences proved of little use in the Winter War against Finland in 1939, where scores of inexperienced Soviet bomber and fighter pilots were shot down by a relatively small number of Finnish Air Force pilots. The VVS soon learned established Soviet air defence procedures derived from the Spanish Civil War, such as forming defensive circles when attacked, did not work well against the Finns, who employed dive-and-zoom tactics to shoot down their Soviet opponents in great numbers. 

On 1 January 1941, six months prior to Operation Barbarossa, the Air Forces of the Soviet Red Army had 363,900 serving personnel, accounting for 8.65% of all military force personnel of the Soviet Union. The first three Air Armies, designated Air Armies of Special Purpose, were created between 1936 and 1938. On 5 November 1940 these were reformed as the Long Range Bombardment Aviation of the High Command of the Red Army (until February 1942) due to lack of combat performance during the Winter War with Finland.

Early World War II aviation failures
1930s Soviet aviation also had a particular impact on the USSR's military failures in the beginning of World War II. By 1938, the Soviet Union had the largest air force in the world, but Soviet aeronautical design distinctly lagged behind Western technological advances. Instead of focusing on developing tactical aircraft, the Soviets engineers developed heavy bomber planes only good for long distance—in other words, planes that would be used for record-breaking flights like those of Chkalov's. The Soviet government's focus on showy stunts and phenomenal record-breaking missions drained resources needed for Soviet defense. When Nazi Germany attacked the Soviet Union in June 1941, it quickly became apparent that the Soviet Air Force was not prepared for war. Poor planning and lack of organization left planes sitting at airbases, allowing the Luftwaffe to destroy 4,000 Soviet planes within the first week.

World War II

At the outbreak of World War II, the Soviet military was not yet at a level of readiness suitable for winning a war: Joseph Stalin had said in 1931 Soviet industry was "50 to 100 years behind" the Western powers. By the end of the war, Soviet annual aircraft production had risen sharply, reaching 40,241 in 1944. Some 157,261 machines were produced during the Great Patriotic War, 125,655 being of combat types.

One of the main reasons for the large aircraft losses in the initial period of war with Germany was not the lack of modern tactics, but the lack of experienced pilots and ground support crews, the destruction of many aircraft on the runways due to command failure to disperse them, and the rapid advance of Heer troops, forcing the Soviet pilots on the defensive during Operation Barbarossa, while being confronted with more modern German designs. In the first few days of the invasion of the Soviet Union, the Luftwaffe destroyed some 2,000 Soviet aircraft, most on the ground, at a loss of only 35 (of which 15 were non-combat-related).

The principal VVS aircraft during World War II were the Ilyushin Il-2 Shturmovik armored ground attack monoplane and the series of AS Yakovlev OKB-115 designed single-engined fighters, beginning with the Yak-1 and its successors. The Il-2 became (at 36,183 built) the most produced military aircraft of all time, with the four main versions of Yak fighters (the Yak-1, −3, −7 and −9) being slightly more numerous, at a total of 36,716 among them. These two main types together accounted for about half the strength of the VVS for most of the Great Patriotic War. The Yak-1 was a modern 1940 design and had room for development, unlike the mature 1935-origin Messerschmitt Bf 109. The Yak-9 brought the VVS to parity with the Luftwaffe and eventually allowed it to gain the upper hand, until in 1944, many Luftwaffe pilots deliberately avoided combat with the last and best variant, the out-of-sequence numbered Yak-3. The other main VVS types were Lavochkin fighters (mainly the La-5), the Petlyakov Pe-2 twin engined attack-bombers, and a basic but functional and versatile medium bomber, the Ilyushin Il-4.

The 31st Bomber Aviation Regiment, equipped with Pe-2s and commanded by Colonel Fyodor Ivanovich Dobysh, was one of the first Guards bomber units in the Air Forces – the 4th Guards Bomber Aviation Regiment (:ru:4-й гвардейский пикирующий бомбардировочный авиационный полк). The title was conferred on the regiment for its actions on the Leningrad Front in November–December 1941 during defensive operations and the Soviet counterattack near Tikhvin.

Women
Alone among World War II combatants, the Soviet Air Force initiated a program to bring women with existing flying training into combat air groups. Marina Raskova, one of very few women in the VVS prior to the war, used her influence with Stalin to form three all-female air regiments: the 586th Fighter Aviation Regiment, the 587th Bomber Aviation Regiment, and the 588th Night Bomber Aviation Regiment (a.k.a. the Night Witches.) Women flew aircraft so heavy that sometimes two of them were required to haul back on the joystick on takeoff.

Due to their achievements in battle, the latter two air force units were honored by being renamed Guards units. Beyond the three official regiments, individual Soviet women sometimes served alongside airmen in otherwise all-male groups. Women pilots, navigators, gunners, mechanics, armament specialists and other female ground personnel made up more than 3,000 fighting members of the VVS. Women pilots flew 24,000 sorties. From this effort came the world's only two female fighter aces: Lydia Litvyak and Katya Budanova.

Innovation and Lend-lease
While there were scores of Red Army divisions on the ground formed from specific Soviet republics, there appears to have been very few aviation regiments formed from nationalities, among them being the 1st Latvian Night Aviation Regiment.

Chief Marshal of Aviation Alexander Novikov led the VVS from 1942 to the end of the war, and was credited with introducing several innovations and weapons systems. For the last year of the war German military and civilians retreating towards Berlin were hounded by the presence of "low flying aircraft" strafing and bombing them, an activity in which even the ancient Polikarpov Po-2, a much produced flight training (uchebnyy) biplane of 1920s design, took part. However, this was but a small measure of the experience the Wehrmacht were receiving due to the sophistication and superiority of the Red Air Force. In one strategic operation alone, the Yassy-Kishinev Strategic Offensive, the 5th and 17th Air Armys and the Black Sea Fleet Naval Aviation aircraft achieved a 3.3 to 1 superiority in aircraft over Luftflotte 4 and the Royal Romanian Air Force, allowing almost complete freedom from air harassment for the ground troops of the 2nd and 3rd Ukrainian Fronts.

As with many Allied countries in World War II, the Soviet Union received Western aircraft through Lend-Lease, mostly Bell P-39 Airacobras, Bell P-63 Kingcobras, Curtiss P-40 Kittyhawks, Douglas A-20 Havocs, Hawker Hurricanes, and North American B-25 Mitchells. Some of these aircraft arrived in the Soviet Union in time to participate in the Battle of Moscow, and in particular with the PVO or Soviet Air Defence Forces. Soviet fliers in P-39s scored the highest individual kill totals of any ever to fly a U.S. aircraft. Two air regiments were equipped with Spitfire Mk.Vbs in early 1943 but immediately experienced unrelenting losses due to friendly fire as the British aircraft looked too much like the German Bf 109. The Soviet Union was then supplied with some 1,200 Spitfire Mk. IXs from 1943. Soviet pilots liked them but they did not suit Soviet combat tactics and the rough conditions at the forward airfields close to the front lines. Spitfires Mk. IXs were therefore assigned to air defense units, using the high altitude performance to intercept and pursue German bombers and reconnaissance aircraft. By 1944, the Spitfire IX was the main fighter used in this role and would remain so until 1947. Lend-Lease aircraft from the U.S. and UK accounted for nearly 12% of total Soviet air power.

The greatest Soviet fighter ace of World War II was Ivan Nikitovich Kozhedub, who scored 62 victories from 6 July 1943 to 16 April 1945, the top score for any Allied fighter pilot of World War II.

Cold War

In 1945–46, the WPKA Army Air Forces became the Soviet Air Forces once again. Its capabilities increased, helped by Western transfer of technology: the downed Boeing B-29 Superfortresses in the Far East, and British transfer of Rolls-Royce Nene jet engines. The force became one of the best services of the Soviet Armed Forces due to the various types of aircraft being flown and their capabilities and the strength and training of its pilots. Its air defence arm became an independent component of the armed forces in 1949, reaching full-fledged force status in 1954 as the Soviet Air Defence Force.

During the Cold War, the Soviet Air Force was rearmed, strengthened and modern air doctrines were introduced. At its peak in 1980, it could deploy approximately 10,000 aircraft, making it the world's largest air force of the time.

The Soviet Air Force covertly participated in the Korean War. Twelve fighter divisions of 26,000 pilots participated in air-to-air combat with the U.S. and other Allied air forces, inflicting significant casualties. The 64th Fighter Aviation Corps supervised the Soviet interceptor forces. In order to keep their involvement a secret, Joseph Stalin ordered the Soviet Air Force MiG-15s participating in the conflict to fly with Korean People's Air Force and PLA Air Force markings, wear Chinese uniforms, and speak only Chinese phrases over radio in the air.

In 1977 the VVS and the Soviet Air Defence Forces were re-organised in the Baltic states and the Leningrad Oblast, as a trial run for the larger re-organisation in 1980 covering the whole country. All fighter units in the PVO were transferred to the VVS, the Air Defence Forces only retaining the anti-aircraft missile units and radar units. The 6th Independent Air Defence Army was disbanded, and the 15th Air Army became the Air Forces of the Baltic Military District. The experiment was then applied countrywide in 1980. Two of the three aviation schools in the Troops of National Air Defence were transferred to the Air Force.

Western analysts found that Soviet non-Slavs, including Jews, Armenians, and Asians were generally barred from senior ranks and from joining elite or strategic positions in the Air Force, Strategic Rocket Forces, and the Soviet Navy because of doubts regarding the loyalty of ethnic minorities. RAND analyst S. Enders Wimbush said, "Soldiers are clearly recruited in a way that reflects the worries of society. The average Russian citizen and Soviet decision maker have questions about the allegiance of the non-Slav, especially the Central Asian."  

During the Cold War the VVS was divided into three main branches: Long Range Aviation(DA), with long-range bombers; Frontal Aviation (Frontovaya Aviatsiya – FA), focused on battlefield air defence, close air support, and interdiction; and Military Transport Aviation (Voenno-Transportnaya Aviatsiya – VTA), which controlled all transport aircraft. The Soviet Air Defence Force, which operated interceptor aircraft and surface to air missiles, was then a separate and distinct service within the Soviet military organisation. Yet another independent service was the Soviet Navy's air arm, the Soviet Naval Aviation under the Navy Headquarters.

The official day of VVS was the Soviet Air Fleet Day, that often featured notable air shows meant to display Soviet air power advancements through the years, held in Moscow's Tushino airfield.

Breakup of the Soviet Union
Following the dissolution of the Soviet Union in December 1991 the aircraft and personnel of the Soviet VVS were divided among the newly independent states. Russia received the plurality of these forces, approximately 40% of the aircraft and 65% of the manpower, with these forming the basis for the new Russian Air Force.

Forces in the late 1980s

The Soviet Air Force's aviation assets were organised into four types of forces (sing. вид авиации) - Long Range Aviation, Frontal Aviation, Military Transport Aviation and Army Aviation (which would transfer to the Ground Forces in case of war). Pilot training establishments were integrated into the Air Armies of the Frontal Aviation.

Higher command echelons of the Air Forces 

In addition, the 34th Mixed Aviation Corps (:ru:34-й смешанный авиационный корпус), later re-designated to the Air Forces of the 40th Army, supported the 40th Army in Afghanistan during the Soviet–Afghan War. Its HQ was in Kabul, Democratic Republic of Afghanistan, co-located with the HQ of the 40th Army itself.

Directly subordinated to the AF Main Staff 
Several formations and flying units were directly subordinated to the Air Forces Main Staff (Главный штаб ВВС). They provided air transport for high-ranking government and military officials, flight testing or support to other research and development fields.

Units directly subordinated to the Main Staff:

 21st Aviation Squadron of Flying Laboratories - Kubinka - An-12, An-26, Mi-8
 27th Helicopter Squadron - Semipalatinsk, Kazakh SSR - Mi-8 (provided liaison flight support to the Semipalatinsk Nuclear Test Center)
 101st Test [Support] Aviation Squadro (287th according to some sources) - Nukus, Uzbekistan SSR - An-26, Mi-8 (provided support to the 8th Chemical Defence Station test range on the Ustyurt Plateau)
 220th Test [Support] Aviation Squadron of Specific Purpose - Aralsk, Kazakh SSR - An-72, An-26, Mi-26, Mi-8, An-2 (provided airborne telemetric surveillance support to the Kapustin Yar missile test range. The airfield also provided liaison flights to the top-secret "Barkhan" bacteriological warfare test range on Vozrozhdeniya Island)
 unidentified Aviation Squadron - Klin - Tu-134, An-12, An-26, An-24, Mi-8 (Klin air base was also considered the 'household' airfield of the Air Defence Forces aviation and a mixed air regiment was based there with the mission to provide liaison flights to the Air Defence Forces Main Staff and flight skills refreshment for the high ranking pilot officers)
 Transport Aviation Squadron - Privolzhskiy (near Astrakhan) - Il-18, An-26, Mi-8 (provided liaison flights to the 116th Combat Application Training Center of the Air Defence Aviation
 2nd State Central Test Range (designation in some sources given as the) - Semipalatinsk
 Transport Aviation Squadron - ZATO Kurchatov-21 (also listed sometimes as the Semipalatinsk-21) - An-30RR, An-24RR, Mi-8/9 (RR - Radiation Reconnaissance)
 Transport Aviation Squadron - Semipalatinsk (Zhanasemei airfield) - An-30, An-24RR
 5th Central Scientific Research Institute (designation in some sources given as the - Voronezh
 Composite Aviation Squadron - Voronezh Airport - Il-20, Mi-8 (EW)
 8th Aviation Division of Specific Purpose - Chkalovsky
 353th Aviation Regiment of Specific Purpose - Chkalovsky - Il-62, Tu-154, Tu-134, Il-18, Il-76, An-72
 354th Aviation Regiment of Specific Purpose - Chkalovsky - Il-76, Il-22, An-12, An-26, An-24
 (355th Aviation Regiment of Specific Purpose - Chkalovsky - disbanded in 1989 and absorbed into the 353rd Aviation Regiment along with its Tu-134 and Tu- 154 aircraft)
 Composite Aviation Squadron - Chkalovsky - Il-80 (4 aircraft), Il-76RT (2 aircraft) (attached to the 8th ADSP for air traffic control, ground support and maintenance, but reporting directly to the Ministry of Defence. The Il-80 was the airborne command center variant of the Il-86 and the Soviet counterpart to the E-4. The four Il-80 received command task force of officers detailed from the Ministry of Defence when on airborne duty. The two Il-76RT were relay aircraft (RT - 'retranslator') and had no command task force on board. They provided Ultra high frequency link between the Soviet nuclear triad and the command centers and were equipped with drag antennae array, which could extend to a total length of 6 kilometers. The Navy's SSBNs and the Air Force's Long Range Aviation normally used alternative communications channels, so the main task for the Il-76RTs remained to provide a link to the Strategic Rocket Forces. The command and control system was designated "Chain Link" ("Звено") and included the Il-80s, the Il-76RTs, the underground silo-based 'Perimetr' and the railway-based 'Gorn command alert missiles.)
 High Command of the Forces of the Southern Strategic Direction - Baku, Azerbaijan SSR
 300th Composite Aviation Squadron - Kala - Tu-154, Tu-134, Il-22, An-26, An-24, Mi-6, Mi-8/9, Ka-27PS, An-2, Mi-2
 High Command of the Forces of the South-Western Strategic Direction - Kishinev, Moldavian SSR
 153rd Composite Aviation Squadron - Kishinev - Tu-134, Il-22, An-72, An-26, An-24, Mi-8/9
 Warsaw Pact Organisation 
 25th Composite Aviation Squadron - Legnica and Krzywa, Polish People's Republic - Tu-134, Il-22, An-12, An-72, An-26, Mi-8
 100th Helicopter Flight - Damascus, Syrian Arab Republic - Mi-8PPA/SMV/MTPI (supporting the Soviet military advisors embedded in the Syrian military)
 929th State Flight Test Center named after V. P. Chkalov of the Ministry of Defence of the USSR - Akhtubinsk (testing of each type of military aircraft destined for the Air Force, Air Defence Forces, Naval Aviation and export)
 75th Composite Aviation Regiment - Akhtubinsk - Ан-12, Ан-26, Ан-24, Ан-72, Ту-154, Ми-8
 333rd Composite Aviation Regiment - Akhtubinsk - Tu-16, MiG-21
 Air Force Test Pilots Training Center - Akhtubinsk - MiG-21, L-39, Yak-40, An-26, Mi-8
 Composite Aviation Regiment of Specific Purpose - Су-27, МиГ-29, Ка-25, Ка-27, Ми-14, Ка-29, Ан-12, Ан-72, Ил-38, Ту-142, MI-6, Mi-8, Як-38 (flight testing of naval aviation)
 368th Composite Aviation Squadron - Nalchik Airport - An-12, Mi-8 (mountain testing)
 47th Composite Aviation Squadron - An-26, Mi-8
 Composite Aviation Squadron - Il-76, An-12, An-72, An-26
 Helicopter Squadron - Mi-26, Mi-6, Mi-8
 Aviation Flight (possibly two separate air flights based at Chkalovsky, one flying Il-20 and another one flying Il-22)
 Nizhny Tagil Metal Proving Institute 
 Flight Test Base - Salka airfield, Nizhny Tagil - Tu-16, Su-24, Su-25, MiG-21, An-12, An-24 (testing of aviation armaments)

Military Transport Aviation
The Soviet Military Transport Aviation had the following structure in the end of the 1980s:Military Transport Aviation Command''', Moscow, RSFSR

 18th Guards Taganrogskaya, awarded the Order of the Red Banner, the Order of Suvorov and the Order of Kutuzov Military Transport Aviation Division, Šiauliai, Lithuanian SSR
 128th Guards Leningradskiy, awarded the Order of the Red Banner Military Transport Aviation Regiment, Panevėžys, Lithuanian SSR - Ilyushin Il-76M
 196th Guards Minskiy Military Transport Aviation Regiment, Tartu, Estonian SSR - Ilyushin Il-76M
 600th Military Transport Aviation Regiment, Kėdainiai, Lithuanian SSR - Ilyushin Il-76
 117th Berlinskiy, awarded the Order of Kutuzov Aviation Regiment for Radio-electronic warfare, Šiauliai, Lithuanian SSR - Antonov An-12PP/PPS
 6th Guards Zaporozhskaya, awarded the Order of Bogdan Khmelnitsky Military Transport Aviation Division, Kryvyi Rih, Ukrainian SSR
 37th Military Transport Aviation Regiment, Artsyz, Ukrainian SSR - Ilyushin Il-76
 338th Military Transport Aviation Regiment, Zaporizhzhia, Ukrainian SSR - Ilyushin Il-76
 363rd Cherkaskiy, awarded the Order of Suvorov and the Order of Bogdan Khmelnitsky Military Transport Aviation Regiment, Kryvyi Rih, Ukrainian SSR - Ilyushin Il-76
 7th Military Transport Aviation Division Melitopol, Ukrainian SSR
 25th Moskovskiy Military Transport Aviation Regiment - Ilyushin Il-76
 175th Military Transport Aviation Regiment - Ilyushin Il-76
 369th Military Transport Aviation Regiment - Ilyushin Il-76
 3rd Guards Smolenskaya, awarded the Order of Suvorov and the Order of Kutuzov Military Transport Aviation Division, Vitebsk, Byelorussian SSR
 110th Military Transport Aviation Regiment, Krechevitsy (near Novgorod), RSFSR - Ilyushin Il-76
 334th Berlin Red Banner, Vitebsk, Byelorussian SSR - Ilyushin Il-76
 12th Mginskaya Red Banner Military Transport Aviation Division, Tver, RSFSR
 566th Solnechnogorskiy, awarded the Order of the Red Banner and the Order of Kutuzov Military Transport Aviation Regiment, Seshta (near Bryansk), RSFSR - Antonov An-124
 978th Military Transport Aviation Regiment, Seshta (near Bryansk), RSFSR - Antonov An-124 (2 squadrons), Ilyushin Il-76 (1 squadron)
 8th Military Transport Aviation Regiment, Tver, RSFSR - Antonov An-22
 81st Military Transport Aviation Regiment, Ivanovo - Severny - Antonov An-22
 separate Military Transport Aviation regiments: 
 192nd Guards Kerchenskiy Red Banner Military Transport Aviation Regiment , Ukkurey, Chita Oblast, RSFSR - Ilyushin Il-76MD
 708th Military Transport Aviation Regiment, Taganrog, Rostov Oblast, RSFSR - Ilyushin Il-76MD
 930th Komsomolskiy Transylvanskiy Red Banner Military Transport Aviation Regiment, Zavitinsk, Amur Oblast, RSFSR - Antonov An-12
 194th Guards Bryanskiy Red Banner Military Transport Aviation Regiment named after N. F. Gastello, Fergana, Uzbek SSR - Antonov An-12
 training establishments
 610th Center for Combat Training and Conversion of Flight Personnel of the Military Transport Aviation, Ivanovo - Severny - Ilyushin Il-76 (2 training and 1 test and evaluation squadrons)
 wartime mobilization assets
 the State-owned flag carrier Aeroflot was wartime mobilization reserve to the Military Transport Aviation, with some Il-76 aircraft of the civilian air company as much as retaining the aft self-defence gun turrets (Aeroflot Il-76MD)
 airlift assets outside the Military Transport Aviation
 8th Aviation Division of Special Purpose, Moscow - Chkalovskiy Air Base, RSFSR - transport and command aviation unit for the USSR's high officials
 70th Transport Regiment of Special Purpose, Moscow - Chkalovskiy Air Base, RSFSR - Ilyushin Il-62, Il-86, Il-76
 353rd Transport Regiment of Special Purpose, Moscow - Chkalovskiy Air Base, RSFSR - Antonov An-12, An-26, An-24
 354th Transport Regiment of Special Purpose, Moscow - Chkalovskiy Air Base, RSFSR - Tupolev Tu-134, Tu-154
 Separate Aviation Squadron for Command and Retranslation, Moscow - Chkalovskiy Air Base, RSFSR - Ilyushin Il-80, Il-82
 Each Strategic Direction Command and each Military District also had a Composite Aviation Regiment, which included An-24, An-26 (possibly An-12) transport aircraft, Mi-8 (possibly) Mi-2 helicopters and a Tu-134 as the commander of the strategic direction or the military district's personal transport aircraft.

Training schools of the VVS and PVO
A Krasnaya Zvezda military schools list of 17 January 1980 included 24 Air Forces schools. Nine Higher Aviation Schools of Pilots were reported (including the Borisoglebsk Higher Military Aviation School of Pilots at Borisoglebsk), two navigator schools (including the Chelyabinsk Higher Military Aviation School of Navigators/50th Anniversary of the Komsomols), the Khar'kov Higher Military Aviation Command School of Signals, five three-year technical secondary schools, six Air Force engineering schools (including the Kiev Higher Military Aviation Engineering School), and the Kurgan Higher Military-Political Aviation School.

In 1988, schools included:
 5th Central Course for Preparation and Improvement of Aviation Personnel, Frunze, Chui Oblast, Kyrgyz SSR (HQ VVS)
 796th Red Banner Center for Preparation of Officers for Fighter and Fighter-Bomber Aviation, Totskoye, Orenburg Oblast (HQ VVS)
 Armavir Higher Military Aviation School of Pilots PVO (Air Forces of the North Caucasus Military District)
 Balashov Higher Military Aviation School of Pilots (Air Forces of the Volga-Ural Military District)
 Barnaul Higher Military Aviation School of Pilots (HQ Barnaul, Altai Krai)(Air Forces of the Siberian Military District) - 44th (Panfilovo), 54th, 99th, 662nd Training Aviation Regiments in 1990.
 Borisoglebsk Higher Military Aviation School of Pilots (Borisoglebsk, VVS NCMD)
 Chelyabinsk Higher Military Aviation School of Navigators
 Kacha Higher Military Aviation School of Pilots (Volgograd, HQ VVS)(:ru:Качинское высшее военное авиационное училище лётчиков)
 Kansk Military Aviation School of Air Rifle-Radio Operators VVS (Kansk, VVS Siberian Military District)
 Krasnodar Higher United Flight-Technical School (Krasnodar, VVS NCMD; :ru:Краснодарское высшее военное авиационное училище лётчиков)
 Orenburg Higher Military Aviation School of Pilots (Orenburg, VVS Volga-Ural Military District)
 Saratov Higher Military Aviation School of Pilots (Saratov, VVS Volga-Urals Military District; helicopter training)
 Stavropol Higher Military Aviation School of Pilots and Navigators PVO (Stavropol, VVS North Caucasus Military District)
 Syzran Higher Military Aviation School of Pilots
 Tambov Higher Military Aviation School of Pilots (Tambov, Tambov Oblast, Air Forces of the Moscow Military District)
 Ufa Higher Military Aviation School of Pilots (Ufa)
 Yeysk Higher Military Aviation School (Yeysk, :ru:Ейский высший военный авиационный институт)
 17th Air Army (Kiev Military District, primarily a training force)
 Chernigov Higher Military Aviation School of Pilots (Chernigov, VVS Kiev Military District)
 Kharkov Higher Military Aviation School of Pilots (Kharkiv-Chuguyev, VVS Kiev Military District)
 Voroshilovgrad Higher Military Aviation School of Navigators (Lugansk)

There is also a list of Soviet Air Force bases listing the various air bases of the force.

Commanders-in-Chief

Soviet Air Force inventory in 1990

 175 strategic bombers
 160 Tupolev Tu-95
 15 Tupolev Tu-160

 390 medium bombers
 80 Tupolev Tu-16
 120 Tupolev Tu-22
 190 Tupolev Tu-22M

 1,275 fighters 
 50 Mikoyan-Gurevich MiG-21
 595 Mikoyan-Gurevich MiG-23
 90 Sukhoi Su-27
 540 Mikoyan MiG-29

 2,510 attack aircraft
 535 Sukhoi Su-17
 830 Sukhoi Su-24
 340 Sukhoi Su-25
 905 Mikoyan MiG-27

 74 tankers
 14 Ilyushin Il-78
 40 Myasishchev M-4 'Molot'
 20 Tupolev Tu-16

 835 Reconnaissance and Electronic countermeasures (ECM) aircraft
 50 Mikoyan-Gurevich MiG-21
 160 Mikoyan-Gurevich MiG-25
 135 Sukhoi Su-17
 150 Sukhoi Su-24
 170 Yakovlev Yak-28
 120 Tupolev Tu-16
 20 Tupolev Tu-22M
 30 Ilyushin Il-22

 577 transport aircraft
 12 Antonov An-124
 55 Antonov An-22
 125 Antonov An-12
 385 Ilyushin Il-76
 2,935 civilian and other transport aircraft, usually Aeroflot aircraft which were easily converted

See also
 List of Russian aviators
 List of Russian aerospace engineers
 Soviet air shows

 References 

 
 
 
 
 
 
 
 
 
  For sale by the Supt. of Docs., U.S. G.P.O.

 Bibliography 
 Andersson, Lennart. Soviet Aircraft and Aviation, 1917–1941. Annapolis, MD: Naval Institute Press, 1994. .
  (January 1976)
 Bergman, Jay (January 1998). "Valerii Chkalov: Soviet Pilot as New Soviet Man". Journal of Contemporary History 33 (1): 136.
 Boyd, Alexander. The Soviet Air Force Since 1918. New York: Stein and Day, 1977. With section of black-and-white photographic plates, charts. maps and diagrams, together with index. First published in The Soviet Air Force by Macdonald and Janes (UK) in 1977.
 
 Guest, Carl-Fredrick. "Talkback". Air Enthusiast, No. 18, April – July 1982. pp. 78–79. .

 Loza, D. F. Attack of the Airacobras: Soviet Aces, American P-39s, and the Air War Against Germany. Lawrence, KS: University Press of Kansas, 2001. .
 Mason, Richard Anthony, and John William Ransom Taylor. Aircraft, strategy, and operations of the Soviet Air Force. London: Jane's, 1986. 
 Palmer, Scott (2005). "Icarus, East: The Symbolic Contexts of Russian Flight". The Slavic and East European Journal 49 (1): 38.
 Pennington, Reina. (2002) Wings, Women, and War: Soviet Airwomen in World War II Combat. Lawrence, KS: University Press of Kansas, 2002. .
 
 Wagner, Ray (ed.), Fetzer, Leland, (trans.), The Soviet Air Force in World War II: The Official History, Wren Publishing, Melbourne, 1973 
 Whiting, Kenneth (1986). Soviet Air Power (Revised Ed).'' Boulder, Colorado: Westview Press.
 "Советские Войска ПВО в последние годы Союза ССР. Часть 1" by A.G. Lenskiy and M.M. Tsybin, Saint Petersburg 2013, 164 pages
 "Все истребительные авиаполки Сталина" by V. Anokhin and M Bykhov, Moscow 2014, 944 pages

External links 

 Dictatorship of the Air Website and blog devoted to Soviet/Russian aviation history
 Globalsecurity.org on Russian air arms, useful for structure of Soviet Air Force

 01
Disbanded air forces
Military of the Soviet Union
Military history of Russia
1918 establishments in Russia
1991 disestablishments in the Soviet Union
Military units and formations established in 1918
Military units and formations disestablished in 1991